Anga Makubalo (born 28 May 1987), popularly known by his musical name NaakMusiQ, is a South African actor and musician. He is best known for his roles in the popular TV programs Generations, Z’bondiwe and Isidingo. He is one of the Top 6 of Sowetan's Mzansi's Sexiest 2013.

Personal life
He was born on 28 May 1987 in New Brighton, Port Elizabeth, South Africa. He later moved to Johannesburg with his mother, Nomvula. His father was Musi Qaqambile. He has one brother Khanyiso and one sister, Asanda. He joined Edenvale High School in 2003 for education. During school times, he was good at several games such as soccer, rugby, athletics, and cricket. After finishing school, he joined with Talent International, and studied presenting and acting, where he later became a part-time mentor and coach. In 2009, he moved to Damelin, Bramley, and studied contemporary music at Damelin.

Career
After studying contemporary music, he began his musical career with the help of his friend Rokker Rogerz who introduced him to Lunga Nombewu of Baainar Records. He later became the first vocalist to be signed under Baainar label as well. He released several hit songs such as Ndiyindoda, Move, Ntombi Ethandwayo, Crazy and Qina. In 2015, he joined Afrotainment and released only  one album which was released on 31 October 2016. The album consists with a total of 14 Naakmusiq songs such as What Have You Done, Children, Miss Me and Give and Take My Piano.

In 2010, he first auditioned for the role 'Nicolus' but was unsuccessful due to inability to speak Tswana. Then he made a guest appearance on the television serial Mino Mania in 2011 as a singer in a minor role. In 2019, he released the single 'Ndakwenza Ntoni'. In 2020, he released the single 'Camagu' together with Mobi Dixon.

In 2011, he joined the cast of Generations and played the role of 'MJ Memela'. Then he continued to appear in several television serials such as Z’bondiwe season 1, 2, and 3, and played the role 'Ntando Mabatha' started in 2015. He also became the host of the program 'All Access Mzansi Season 10' together with Mbali Nkosi in 2015.

In early April 2022, Makubalo was announced to be the host of Tropika Island Of Treasure All Stars.

Filmography
 Broken Vows as Chulu
 Come Duze as Performer
 Generations as MJ Memela
 Igazi as Bantu
 Isidingo as Obakeng
 Isithembiso as Lucky
 Isono: The Sin as Makwande Mabongo
 Ring of Lies as Buzwe
 Tropika Island of Treasure as Contestant
 Zaziwa as himself
 Z'bondiwe as Ntando Mabatha

See also
 Dreams Never Die

References

External links
 
 Anga Makubalo’s Fans Are Crushing On His Dad
 Awards and 'huge insecurities'! Inside Prince Kaybee & Anga Makubalo’s fiery twar

Living people
South African male television actors
1987 births
South African male film actors
People from Port Elizabeth
21st-century South African male singers